Walter Franklin may refer to:

 Walter Franklin (cricketer) (1891–1968), English cricketer
 Walter Franklin (billiards player), American billiards player
 Walter Franklin (judge) (1773–1836), Pennsylvania attorney general and judge
 Walter S. Franklin (politician) (1799–1838), politician from Pennsylvania
 Walter S. Franklin (PRR) (1884–1972), president of the Pennsylvania Railroad (PRR)

See also